Giordano Damiani (27 June 1930 – 13 March 1999) was an Italian basketball player. He competed in the men's tournament at the 1952 Summer Olympics.

References

External links
 

1930 births
1999 deaths
Italian men's basketball players
Olympic basketball players of Italy
Basketball players at the 1952 Summer Olympics
Sportspeople from Trieste